London Buses route 8 is a Transport for London contracted bus route in London, England. Running between Bow Church and Tottenham Court Road station, it is operated by Stagecoach London.

History

On 2 November 1908, the bus route number 8 was allocated to a previously un-numbered route operating between the Bush Hotel in Shepherd's Bush and Seven Kings High Road in Ilford.  On 20 June 1912, routes 8 and 25 exchanged eastern ends at Bank, so that from then on route 8 operated between Willesden and Old Ford. This situation continued, apart from various westward extensions of the route to Wembley and Alperton, until 18 July 1992. At that time route 8 again was re-routed over route 25, and now operated from Victoria bus station to Bow Church via Old Ford, the same routing as the 1912 version of route 25. The western end of the route beyond Bond Street became 98.

On 3 January 1933, AEC Regent STL buses were used from Clay Hall garage. In May 1949, Leyland Titan RTWs were introduced on route 8. In January 1958, the third prototype AEC Routemaster began operation on route 8 between Willesdan and Old Ford. On 6 June 1959, the first three production Routemasters to enter service in London (RM5, RM7 and RM24) debuted on route 8 from Willesden garage.

On 27 June 2009, route 8 was curtailed west of Oxford Circus. Route C2 was extended to Victoria station as a replacement. The changes were part of Transport for London's commitment to the Mayor of London to reduce the bus flow in Oxford Street by 10% in each of 2009 and 2010.

Stagecoach London has successfully retained route 8 with new contracts starting on 26 June 2004, 27 June 2009 and 28 June 2014.

New Routemasters were introduced on 28 June 2014. The rear platform remains closed at all times except for when the bus is at bus stops.

In August 2019, the middle and rear doors on New Routemasters on route 8 became exit only with passengers only able to board through the front door.

Current route
Route 8 operates via these primary locations:
Bow Church
Old Ford Parnell Road
Bethnal Green station 
Brick Lane
Shoreditch High Street station 
Liverpool Street station    
Wormwood Street
Bank station  
St Paul's station 
City Thameslink station 
Holborn Circus
Chancery Lane station 
Holborn station 
Tottenham Court Road

References

External links

Bus routes in London
Transport in the London Borough of Camden
Transport in the City of London
Transport in the London Borough of Hackney
Transport in the London Borough of Tower Hamlets